Vestergade 22 is a Neoclassical property in the Latin Quarter of Copenhagen, Denmark. The building is now part of the Politiken Hus complex. A commemorative plaque mounted on the wall of the gateway summarizes the history of the property, including the fact that Anders Sandøe Ørsted and his wife Sophie lived in the apartment on the first floor from 1805 to 1813. The building was listed on the Danish registry of protected buildings and places in 1959.

History

18th century
The previous building at the site was constructed after the Copenhagen Fire of 1728. The building was for many years owned by dyers and was therefore known as Farvergården (The Dyer's Gouse). The owner would typically live in one of the apartments in the building fronting the street and run his Dyeing business from one of the side wings. An inn also known as Farvergården opened in the other side wing. The property was at some point acquired by dyer Lars Bjørn.

19th century

The property was at some point acquired by dyer Lars Bjørn. The building was together with most of the other buildings in the area destroyed in the Copenhagen Fire of 1795. The current building at the site was constructed for Bjørn in 1798-99. It was later sold to master dyer  Johann Pohlmann. The dyer's plant, the inn Farvergården and a grocer's shop was still operated from the premises. When Pohlmann retired, he sold the property to G. L. Fogh but continued to live in one of the apartments.

The young jurist Anders Sandøe Ørsted and his wife Sophie Ørsted, a sister of Adam Oehlenschläger, lived in the apartment on the first floor from 1805. The couple was part of the city's cultural elite and their home in Vestergade played host to literary salons. Oehlenschläger's first great historical tragedy, Haakon Jrl, was at a private party in the Ørsted couple's home on 9 March read aloud for the first time by the actor Michael Rosing. Oehlenschläger, who was traveling Europe at the time, had sent the manuscript home to Anders Sandøe Ørsted's brother Hans Christian Ørsted. The guest list comprised Oehlenschläger's fiancé Christiane Heger, her sister Kamma Rahbek, their brother Carl Heger, their father Hans Heger,, Reinholdine Schönheyder and Albertine Bull.

On Fog's retirement in  1858, Farvergården was sold to dyer and printer H. N. Grundtvig.

The complex was later sold to two brothers named Baumgarten, whose printing business Johan Ludvig Sivertsens Bog- og Stentrykkeri (founded 1849) was from then on based in the side wing. In the 1890s, one of the  Baumgarten brothers took over the apartment on the third floor. overtog i 1890’erne en bolig på 3. sal.

20th century
In 1900, Vestergade 22 was acquired by the hardware wholesaler Bucka & Nissen. The company had been founded by  Marcus Bucka (died 1894) and Hans Nissen (d. 1902) in Flensburg but had moved to Copenhagen as a result of Denmark's loss of Schlesvig-Holstein in 1864. It had from 1884 been based in the side wing of No. 26 and later also taken over No. 24. 

In 1861, Bucka & Nissen moved out of the city centre. Vestergade 22–26 was then sold to the newspaper publisher Politikens Hus. The company's book publisher, Politikens Forlag was from then on based at No. 22. The building was renovated in 1967.

Architecture
The building is seven bays wide and the facade is tipped by a gabled dormer.

References 

Listed buildings and structures in Copenhagen
Buildings and structures completed in 1799
Commemorative plaques in Copenhagen